Gulama (Kannada:ಗುಲಾಮ) is a 2009 Kannada-language film directed by Tushar Ranganath and produced by Ramu. The film stars Prajwal Devraj and Bianca Desai in the lead roles. Music was composed by Gurukiran. The film released statewide on 1 January 2009.

Gulama means bondsman in Kannada.

Cast
Prajwal Devaraj as Anil
Sonu as Divya
Bianca Desai as Priyanka
Rangayana Raghu as Police Constable Nanjundaswamy, Anil's Father 
Avinash as Police Commissioner Vijay kumar singh
Lakshman Rao 
Ganesh Rao Kesarkar 
Sudha Belawadi as Vanajakshi, Anil's Mother 
Shailaja Joshi 
M. N. Lakshmi Devi 
Kaddipudi Chandru as Babloo Chandra 
Malavalli Saikrishna 
Vishwa Kaddi as Pagal Seena 
Sanketh Kashi
N. Vinod Kumar 
Yogi. G. Raj 
Kung-fu Chandru 
Maafi Gowda as himself 
Raghu Samrat 
K. V. Manjayya 
Malathi Sardeshpande 
Mallesh Mysore

Synopsis
The film is about a love triangle: Anil loves Priyanka, and Divya loves Anil.

Soundtrack

The film has five songs composed by Gurukiran, with the lyrics primarily penned by Tushar Ranganath and Kaviraj.

Reception

Critical response 

R G Vijayasarathy of Rediff.com scored the film at 2 out of 5 stars and says "Guru Kiran does not make any impact with his music compositions. Vishnuvardhan's cinematography and Danny's fights choreography are better handled. Gulama may impress the mass audience to some extent, but it is not meant for the family audience."Bangalore Mirror wrote "The background music could have ensured that flashbacks and current narratives are differentiated, but it does not.For the record, the film is dedicated to Vinod Kumar, the aspiring actor shot dead by producer Govardhan Murthy last year." Manjju Shettar of Mid-Day scored the film at 2 out of 5 stars and says "Prajwal and Biyanka are matured in their acting and Sonu will attract the audience. Rangayana Raghu and other actors have done well with their performances. Film's settings are highly rich but choreography has failed. Cameraman K M Vishnuvardan has done a good job with creativity."

References

External links

Official website
review by Yahoo
Soundtrack at Kannadaaudio.com

2000s Kannada-language films
2009 films
Films scored by Gurukiran
2009 directorial debut films